Julián Malatini (born 31 May 2001) is an Argentine professional footballer who plays as a right-back for Defensa y Justicia on loan from Talleres.

Club career
Malatini started out with Unión Deportiva de General Cabrera at the age of five, prior to joining Ateneo Vecinos. He left at the end of 2017 to sign for Talleres, having impressed over a trial period. He made his reserves debut in 2019 against Racing Club, under the guidance of manager Diego Torrentes. He was promoted into their first-team squad towards the end of 2020 under manager Alexander Medina, as the right-back featured in a number of friendlies before the start of the 2020 Copa de la Liga Profesional; he didn't appear in that aforementioned competition, though did make the substitute's bench on six occasions.

After again going unused three times in the subsequent 2021 Copa de la Liga, Malatini's senior debut did arrive on 6 March 2021 during a 1–1 draw away to Sarmiento; he replaced Nahuel Tenaglia after sixty-six minutes.

On 3 January 2023, Malatini joined Defensa y Justicia on loan with an option to make the move permanent.

International career
In 2019, Malatini was selected on the preliminary squad list for the Argentina U18s' trip to Spain for the COTIF Tournament; though didn't make the final cut. He had already received a call-up from the U18s a year prior. December 2020 saw him receive a call to train with the U20s; just over a week after he had signed his first professional contract with Talleres.

Career statistics
.

Notes

References

External links

2001 births
Living people
Sportspeople from Córdoba Province, Argentina
Argentine people of Italian descent
Argentine footballers
Argentina youth international footballers
Argentina under-20 international footballers
Association football defenders
Argentine Primera División players
Talleres de Córdoba footballers
Defensa y Justicia footballers